The Division of Oxley is an Australian Electoral Division in Queensland. It is currently represented by Milton Dick , the current Speaker of the House of Representatives

Geography
Since 1984, federal electoral division boundaries in Australia have been determined at redistributions by a redistribution committee appointed by the Australian Electoral Commission. Redistributions occur for the boundaries of divisions in a particular state, and they occur every seven years, or sooner if a state's representation entitlement changes or when divisions of a state are malapportioned.

History

The current division is the second to bear the name, and was created in 1949. The division is named after the Australian explorer, John Oxley. Oxley is located in south east Queensland, and covers the south western suburbs of Brisbane.

The original Division of Oxley was established in 1901, and was abolished and replaced by the Division of Griffith in 1934. The 1949 incarnation's best-known member was Bill Hayden, the Labor Opposition Leader between 1977 and 1983, when he resigned under pressure the same day that the 1983 election which swept Bob Hawke to power was called. Hayden later served as a minister in the Hawke Government before becoming Governor-General in 1989.

In 1996, the seat became most well known for controversial social conservative MP Pauline Hanson who was elected as a Liberal-turned-independent, but the seat was heavily redistributed in 1997, splitting her main support base of Ipswich between Oxley and Blair. In 1998 Hanson contested the seat of Blair, winning 36% of the primary vote but losing to the Liberals (who got 21%) under Australia's system of preferential voting. Hanson's brief tenure represents the only time since 1961 that the seat has been out of Labor hands.

Members

Election results

References

External links
 Division of Oxley (Qld) — Australian Electoral Commission

Electoral divisions of Australia
Constituencies established in 1949
1949 establishments in Australia
Federal politics in Queensland